The 1979 Brazilian Grand Prix was a Formula One motor race held at Interlagos on 4 February 1979. It was the second race of the 1979 World Championship of F1 Drivers and the 1979 International Cup for F1 Constructors.

Qualifying

Qualifying classification

Race

Race report 
The Ligier team dominated the race weekend with their superior ground-effect JS11. Frenchman Jacques Laffite dominated the race weekend and made the most of his superbly set-up Ligier by taking pole position, smashing Jean-Pierre Jarier's 1975 pole time by 7 seconds, setting fastest lap and leading every lap of the race up to the finish. Laffite's teammate Patrick Depailler started and finished 2nd. Laffite and the Ligier team completed their domination of the South American fortnight, Laffite also dominantly won in Argentina.

Classification

Championship standings after the race

Drivers' Championship standings

Constructors' Championship standings

Notes
  Although the circuit length was quoted in MotorSport magazine as 7.873 km, the fastest lap's time/speed quoted are consistent with the 7.87385 km length, same as quoted in 1980 race report.
  Although the race distance was quoted in MotorSport magazine as 314.92 km, the winner's time/speed quoted are consistent with the 314.954 km distance, same as quoted in 1980 race report.

References

Brazilian Grand Prix
Brazilian Grand Prix
Grand Prix
Brazilian Grand Prix